The Wuerffel Trophy is an award given annually to the college football player "who best combines exemplary community service with athletic and academic achievement." The trophy, designed by W. Stanley Proctor and named in honor of former University of Florida quarterback Danny Wuerffel shows Wuerffel praying after scoring a touchdown.

Wuerffel Trophy Website

Winners

References

College football national player awards
Awards established in 2005